Roland Edouard Rieul (8 January 1906 – 17 May 1995) was a French soldier, a member of the 6th French Division, a prisoner of war, and then after his escape a secret agent for the British SIS. He wrote a memoir Escape Into Espionage: The True Story of a French Patriot.

His memoirs were published in 1986 as Soldier into Spy: the memoirs of Roland Rieul (Kimber) Rieul later lived on the Isle of Wight, where he died in May 1995 at the age of 89.

References

External links
 Interview and photo

1906 births
1995 deaths
World War II spies for the United Kingdom